Regional elections were held in some regions of Italy during 2006. These included:

Sicily on 28 May
Molise on 5 and 6 November

Elections in Italian regions
2006 elections in Italy